The Museum of Ethnology and Paleontology is a museum located in Tsimbazaza in Antananarivo, Madagascar. The museum displays the prehistoric natural history of the island and way of life of its inhabitants.

References

Museums in Antananarivo